German submarine U-654 was a Type VIIC U-boat built for Nazi Germany's Kriegsmarine for service during World War II.
She was laid down on 1 June 1940 by Howaldtswerke, Hamburg as yard number 803, launched on 3 May 1941 and commissioned on 5 July 1941 under Korvettenkapitän Hans-Joachim Hesse.

Design
German Type VIIC submarines were preceded by the shorter Type VIIB submarines. U-654 had a displacement of  when at the surface and  while submerged. She had two shafts and two  propellers.

U-654 was fitted with five  torpedo tubes (four fitted at the bow and one at the stern), fourteen torpedoes, one  SK C/35 naval gun, 220 rounds, and a  C/30 anti-aircraft gun. The boat had a complement of between forty-four and sixty.

Service history
The boat's career began with training at 5th U-boat Flotilla on 5 July 1941, followed by active service on 1 November 1941 as part of the 1st Flotilla for the remainder of her service.

Wolfpacks
U-654 took part in one wolfpack, namely:
 Zieten (6 – 22 January 1942)

Fate
U-654 was sunk on 22 August 1942 in the Caribbean in position , by the depth charges from a United States Army Air Forces Douglas B-18 Bolo aircraft of the 45th Bombardment Squadron. All hands were lost.

Summary of raiding history

References

Notes

Citations

Bibliography

External links

German Type VIIC submarines
1941 ships
U-boats commissioned in 1941
Ships lost with all hands
U-boats sunk in 1942
U-boats sunk by depth charges
U-boats sunk by US aircraft
World War II shipwrecks in the Caribbean Sea
World War II submarines of Germany
Ships built in Hamburg
Maritime incidents in August 1942